Clarke number or clarke is the relative abundance of a chemical element, typically in Earth's crust. The technical definition of "Earth's crust" varies among authors, and the actual numbers also vary significantly.

History 
This was in honor to the American geochemist Frank Wigglesworth Clarke, who pioneered in estimating the chemical composition of Earth's crust, based on Clarke and colleague's extensive chemical analysis of numerous rock samples, throughout 1889 to 1924().

Examples based on Fersman's definition:
 Fersman's "clarke of Earth's crust" is the Earth's surface including 16km-thick lithosphere, hydrosphere and atmosphere.

In Russian 
 is synonymous to "the relative abundance of elements" in any object, either in weight ratio or in atomic (number of atoms) ratio, regardless of how "Earth's crust" is defined, and denotation is not restricted to percents.

In English 
In the English speaking world, the term "clarke" was not even used in Wells(1937) which introduced Fersman's proposal, nor in later USGS articles such as Fleischer(1953). They used the term "relative abundance of the elements". Brian Mason also mentioned the term "clarke" in Mason(1952)(mistakenly attributing it to Vladimir Vernadsky, later corrected to Fersman in Mason(1958)), but the definition slightly differed from Fersman's, limiting it only to the average percentage in Earth's crust, but allowed to exclude hydrosphere and atmosphere. Besides for explaining the term, Mason himself didn't use the term "clarke".

A variant term "clarke value" is occasionally used (examples:). However, "clarke value" can have a different meaning, the clarke of concentration (example:).

Terms "clarke number" and "Clarke number" are found in articles written by Japanese authors (example:).

Usage in Japan 
The term may have a narrower sense than Fersman's. Several of the following constraints may apply:
 Only of Earth's crust
 Lithosphere approximated as a 10 mile-deep layer from sea level
 Must include all of three layers: lithosphere(93.06%), hydrosphere(0.91%) and atmosphere(0.03%)
 Only mass ratio)
 Denote in percents) (not in ppm or ppb)
 (What the quoter believes to be) data from Clarke&Washington(1924)

Another peculiarity in Japan is the existence of a popular version of data, which was tabulated in reference books such as the annual "Chronological Scientific Tables" (RCST1939(1938)), the "Dictionary of Physics and Chemistry" (IDPC(1939)) and other prominent books on geochemistry and chemistry. This version Kimura(1938) was devised by chemist . It was often quoted as The "Clarke numbers" (unsourced examples:,). The numbers differed from any versions by Clarke / Clarke&Washington (1889–1924), or anything listed in foreign (non-Japanese) articles such as the USGS compilation , thus unknown outside of Japan. Yet the numbers were sometimes quoted in English articles without citation (example:).

As geological definition of "Earth's crust" evolved, the "10 mile-deep" approximation were deemed out-of-date, and some people considered the term "clarke number" obsolete too. Yet other people may have meant broader senses, not limiting to Earth's crust, leading to confusion. RCST1961(1961) switched their "clarke number" table from Kimura(1938) to Mason(1958) based, and the label "clarke number" on table was removed in RCST1963(1962). IDPC(1971) removed the "clarke number" table which was a Kimura(1938)'s variant. IDPC(1981) said the term is mostly abandoned, and the dictionary entry for "clarke number" itself was removed from IDPC(1998). So "clarke numbers" became associated almost solely with Kimura(1938)'s data, but Kimura's name forgotten. Incidentally, in major reference books, there was no data table titled "clarke numbers" which showed Clarke's original tables.

Despite being removed from major reference books, data from Kimura(1938) and phrases such as "the Clarke number of iron is 4.70", unsourced, continue to circulate, even in the 2010s (example:).

Example data 
This section lists only historical data. For recent data, see Abundance of elements in Earth's crust.

Technical definition of "clarke", "Earth's crust" and "lithosphere" differ among authors, and the actual numbers vary accordingly, sometimes by several times. Even the same author presents multiple versions, with various estimation parameters or knowledge refinements. Yet they are often quoted without source, rendering the data unverifiable.
Clarke & Washington presented estimations of the average composition of outer part of Earth with 4 variants:
 10-mile crust, hydrosphere and atmosphere.
 20-mile crust, hydrosphere and atmosphere.
 10-mile crust, only igneous rocks and sedimentary rocks. (i.e. exclude hydrosphere and atmosphere)
 10-mile crust, only igneous rocks. (i.e. exclude hydrosphere and atmosphere)
"The earth's crust" in Clarke & Washington works can mean two different things: (a) The whole outer part of Earth, ie. lithosphere, hydrosphere and atmosphere; (b) Only the lithosphere, which in their works just meant "the rocky crust of the earth". "Crust" here means (b).
 Following tables do not cover all elements. Some elements not on the table may have larger abundance. Some minor elements are listed here to aid identifying the origin of unsourced documents.
 Some entries contain data for the disputed element 43 masurium.
 Precision (number of digits) may be adjusted to improve legibility.

Of the mass of 10 mile-thick lithosphere plus hydrosphere and atmosphere 
Tables of historical data for some elements of their relative abundance in Earth's crust.

Other variants 
Some authors call these "clarkes" too, some don't.

Clarke of concentration 
A related term "clarke of concentration" or "concentration clarke", synonym: "concentration factor (mineralogy)", is a measure to see how rich a particular ore is.
That is, the ratio between the concentrations of a chemical element in the ore, and its concentration in the whole Earth's crust (i.e. "clarke") .

Example:

References

Footnotes

Cited works 
 C: Frank Wigglesworth Clarke of USGS and Henry Stephens Washington

 U: United States Geological Survey (USGS)

 B: 

 F: Alexander Fersman

 G: Victor Goldschmidt

 M: Brian Mason

 K: 

 H: Research on the history of chemistry

Examples of usage 
 R: (:ja:理科年表) : An (mostly) annual reference book published in Japan since 1925CE. Note that the actual published year is typically 1 year earlier than the nominal (book title) year.

 I:  : Revised roughly by each decade. First edition 1935CE.

D: Kyoritsu Great Dictionary of Chemistry

X: Other usage examples

See also 
 Abundance of elements in Earth's crust, modern data

Structure of the Earth
Geochemistry
Earth sciences